The Schempp-Hirth Discus is a Standard Class glider designed by Schempp-Hirth. It was produced in Germany between 1984 and 1995 but has continued in production in the Czech Republic.  It replaced the Standard Cirrus.  It was designed by Klaus Holighaus.

Design and development
The Discus was the first production sailplane to have a distinctive swept-back leading edge. This is now common in contemporary sailplanes.

Studies had long shown that the ideal wing for minimizing induced drag should be an elliptic planform. To keep production costs down, a triple-trapezoidal approximation of this shape was adopted for the Discus. The wing section was also new. Winglets were only available towards the end of the production run, though many have been retro-fitted.  The fuselage and tail were adapted from the Schempp-Hirth Ventus.  A version with a narrow fuselage is called the Discus 'a' and the wider fuselage version is called the 'b'. The fuselage is made of glass-reinforced plastic around a steel tube frame. The wings and tail surfaces are also fiberglass with the exception of the main wing spar, which is made of carbon fiber. There is a  water ballast tank in the fin for trimming purposes when the main wing mounted ballast tanks are in use (184 L combined) for a maximum wing-loading of

Competition use
The Discus dominated standard class sailplane racing throughout the 1980s, winning six World Gliding Championships in a row from 1985 to 1995.

Performance
The best measured glide ratio is 42.5:1. Though it is considered a high performance sailplane, its handling is well within the capabilities of inexperienced pilots. With no bad manners, powerful airbrakes and a low landing speed, the Discus is popular with clubs. Discuses are easy gliders to assemble, having light wings, automatic control hookups and a single pin securing the wings.

Production
Over 850 Discuses had been built by 2004 and it remains in production today despite the introduction of its successor, the Schempp-Hirth Discus-2. About 12 per year are built under license by Schempp-Hirth Vyroba in the Czech Republic as the Discus CS. Some models are fitted with small sustaining engines (turbos) and are designated Discus T.

Variants
Discus a Short fuselage and narrow cockpit optimized for smaller pilots, utilising the fuselage and tail of the Ventus a.
Discus bStandard production model utilizing the fuselage and tail of the Ventus b.
Discus bTDiscus b with a retractable sustainer motor
Discus bMMotor-glider with retractable engine
Discus CSContinued production in the Czech Republic                         
Discus K Aerobatic version first flown on 18 November 1987. This was, due to disappointing performance in aerobatic, later converted back to a standard version.

Specifications (Discus b)

See also

References

External links

Schempp-Hirth Website
A Flight Test Evaluation of the Discus Sailplane, by R.H. Johnson, published in Soaring Magazine, February 1986
British Gliding Association, Discus datasheet
Specifications of Schempp-Hirth Discus

1980s German sailplanes
Discus
T-tail aircraft
Aircraft first flown in 1984